The East Turkestan independence movement is a political movement that seeks the independence of East Turkestan, a large and sparsely-populated region in northwest China, as a nation state for the Uyghur people. The region is currently administered as a province-level subdivision of the People's Republic of China (PRC), under the official name Xinjiang Uygur Autonomous Region (XUAR). The East Turkistan independence movement is primarily led by the East Turkistan Government in Exile and supported by the East Turkistan National Awakening Movement.   Within the movement, there is widespread support for the region to be renamed, since "Xinjiang" (meaning "new frontier" in Chinese) is seen by independence activists as a colonial name. "East Turkestan" is the best-known proposed name as it is the historical geographic name of the region and the name of the two independent states that briefly existed in the region in the first half of the 20th century.

Large parts of Xinjiang were under intermittent influence of the Chinese, since roughly 2,000 years ago during the Han dynasty. In 101 BC, during the Han Dynasty the far eastern parts of the region was settled by the Chinese military garrisons, and outposts such as canton points were established, where each point became the initial distribution area for the Han military garrisons after entering the region. After the establishment of the Western Regions' capital Hufu in 60 BC, Han settlers entered the region continuously. The Tang dynasty also influenced the Western Regions until Chinese influence was lost in the 8th century, and direct control of the region would not resume until the Qing dynasty a thousand years later.

Xinjiang fell under the rule of the Qing dynasty in the 1750s. 1759 was the year of the establishment of the original form of the modern-day administrative region. Xinjiang was subsequently inherited by the Republic of China (ROC), which succeeded the Qing dynasty after the 1911 Revolution, and then by the PRC, which mostly succeeded the ROC after the Chinese Communist Revolution (1949), although Taiwan has remained under ROC rule until the present day. Throughout Qing and ROC rule, there were several periods of brief de facto independence for either the entire region of Xinjiang or parts of it, as well as foreign occupation and warlord governance. The PRC incorporation of Xinjiang occurred soon after the PRC was established in 1949, and since then, Xinjiang has remained part of China. Historically, the region had various independent states, mostly nomadic hordes, prior to the 1750s. Xinjiang has been a hotbed of ethnic and religious conflict throughout much of the period that it has been governed by successive Chinese regimes.

The Chinese government considers all support for the East Turkestan independence movement to fall under the definitions of "terrorism, extremism, and separatism" (a.k.a. the "Three Evils"). The East Turkestan independence movement is supported by both militant Islamic extremist groups which have been designated terrorist organizations by several countries and the United Nations, such as the Turkistan Islamic Party, as well as certain advocacy groups, such as the East Turkistan National Awakening Movement and the East Turkistan Government-in-Exile, which is based in Washington, D.C., and denounced militant and jihadist groups.

Proposed name

The most common name for Xinjiang used by independence advocates is "East Turkestan" (or "Uyghurstan"). There is no consensus among secessionists about whether to use "East Turkestan" or "Uyghurstan"; "East Turkestan" has the advantage of also being the name of two historical political entities in the region, while Uyghurstan appeals to modern ideas of ethnic self-determination. Uyghurstan is also a difference in emphasis in that it excludes more peoples in Xinjiang than just the Han, but the "East Turkestan" movement is still a Uyghur phenomenon. The name "East Turkestan" is not currently used in an official sense by most sovereign states and intergovernmental organizations. Another proposed alternative is "Yarkand" or "Yarkent," which harkens back to the Yarkent Khanate, a powerful Uyghur state in the 16th and 17th centuries.

History

Yaqub Beg establishment of Kashgaria

The Kokandi Yaqub Beg invaded Kashgar during the Dungan revolt to establish an independent state after taking advantage of local rebellions.

Also, during the Dungan revolt, the Taranchi Turkic Muslims in Xinjiang initially cooperated with the Dungans (Chinese Muslims) when they rose in revolt, but turned on them, because the Dungans, mindful of their Chinese heritage, attempted to subject the entire region to their rule. The Taranchi massacred the Dungans at Kuldja and drove the rest through the Talk pass into the Ili valley.

Within the Republic of China (1912–1949) 

After the collapse of the Qing Dynasty, the region became largely free of the control of the government of Republic of China (ROC). An early attempt at East Turkestan independence was the establishment of the short-lived "First East Turkestan Republic" (aka "Turkish Islamic Republic of East Turkestan"), which lasted between 1933 and 1934. This republic was formed following a rebellion in Kashgar against the ROC, which had been in the process of asserting control over Kashgar after two decades of Warlordism in the ROC. The Chinese Hui Muslim 36th Division (National Revolutionary Army) suppressed the First East Turkestan Republic following Chinese (ROC) victories at the Battle of Kashgar (1933) and Battle of Kashgar (1934).

During the later years of China under the ROC, which was engaged against the Chinese Communists in the context of the Chinese Civil War, the Soviet Union under leader Joseph Stalin invaded Xinjiang and assisted a local rebellion at Ili (Yining City). The rebellion led to the establishment of the Second East Turkistan Republic (1944–1949), which existed in three northern districts (Ili, Tarbaghatai, Altai) of Xinjiang with secret aid from the Soviet Union. After emerging victorious at the conclusion of the Chinese Civil War in 1949, the People's Liberation Army annexed Xinjiang from the ROC and the Second East Turkestan Republic.

Within the People's Republic of China (1949–present) 
Since the Chinese economic reform from the late 1970s exacerbated uneven regional development, while  Uyghurs have migrated to urbanizing Xinjiang cities, some Hans have also migrated to Xinjiang for independent economic advancement. Increased ethnic contact and labor competition coincided with Uyghur separatist terrorism from the 1990s, such as the 1997 Ürümqi bus bombings.

A police roundup of suspected separatists during Ramadan resulted in large demonstrations that turned violent in February 1997 in an episode known as the Ghulja Incident that led to at least 9 deaths. The Ürümqi bus bombings of 25 February 1997, perhaps a response to the crackdown that followed the Ghulja Incident, killed 9 and injured 68. Speaking on separatist violence, Erkin Alptekin, a former East Turkestan National Congress chairman and prominent Uyghur activist, said: "We must emphasize dialog and warn our youth against the use of violence because it delegitimizes our movement".

Recent events 

Despite much talk of separatism and terrorism in Xinjiang, especially after the 9-11 attacks in the United States and the US invasion of Afghanistan, the situation in Xinjiang was quiet from around 1998 to mid-2006. In 2005, Uygur author Nurmemet Yasin was sentenced to ten years' imprisonment for inciting separatism following his publication of an allegorical short story, "The Blue Pigeon".
Rebiya Kadeer claimed that Turkey is hampered from interfering with the Uyghurs because it recognizes that the Kurdish-Turkish conflict may receive interference from China in retaliation.

Views on independence

Arguments in favor of independence 

Several proponents of independence state that the Uyghurs have had a defined history in Xinjiang for "over 4000 years", a claim which has neither been proven nor disproven. There are historical arguments for the independence of Xinjiang, such as the argument that the People's Republic of China is a colonial occupier of Xinjiang, rather than it naturally being an integral part of the sovereign state which traditionally includes Xinjiang. Evidence for this argument usually consists of claims that the PRC is not the legitimate successor state to either the ROC (now based in Taiwan) or the previous imperial dynasty of China, which is the Qing dynasty, or that previous regimes were also illegitimate.

Arguments against independence
The Government of China is strongly opposed to the idea of Xinjiang (East Turkestan) independence and its supporters are subject to harsh criminal penalties. China officially claims that Xinjiang has been part of China since the Han dynasty of China (220 BC - AD 206) established a Protectorate of the Western Regions in 60 BC. China claims that Xinjiang has always belonged to China even at times when it was occupied by several other countries. Historically, various Chinese governments have described invasions of Xinjiang as a sort of "reconquest" of previously lost territories ever since the Han and Tang dynasties.

Some Uyghur nationalist historians such as Turghun Almas claim that Uyghurs were distinct and independent from Chinese for 6000 years, and that all other ethnic groups are later immigrants to Xinjiang. Records show that military colonies (tuntian) and commanderies (duhufu) were set up by the Han Dynasty to control Xinjiang, while the Tang Dynasty (618–907) also controlled much of Xinjiang until the An Lushan rebellion. Chinese historians refute Uyghur nationalist claims by pointing out the 2000-year history of Han settlement in Xinjiang, documenting the history of Mongol, Kazakh, Uzbek, Manchu, Hui, Xibo indigenes in Xinjiang, and by emphasizing the relatively late "westward migration" of the Huigu (equated with "Uyghur" by the PRC government) people from Mongolia the 9th century. The name "Uyghur" was associated with a Buddhist people in the Tarim Basin in the 9th century, but completely disappeared by the 15th century, until it was revived by the Soviet Union in the 20th century.

Chinese government view 
The government of the People's Republic of China considers all support for the East Turkestan independence movement to fall under the definitions of "terrorism, extremism, and separatism". Xinjiang has made great economic strides, building up its infrastructure, improving its education system and increasing the average life expectancy.

In a 2014 speech, CCP general secretary Xi Jinping argued that the dissolution of the Soviet Union demonstrated that economic development alone would not prevent separatism in Xinjiang. He elaborated “In recent years, Xinjiang has grown very quickly and the standard of living has consistently risen, but even so, ethnic separatism and terrorist violence have still been on the rise. This goes to show that economic development does not automatically bring lasting order and security.”

In 2020, the Chinese government published a White Paper on Employment and Labor Rights in Xinjiang, which had been circulated via Xinhua, the Global Times and other public news channels. In this paper, the Chinese Communist Party and government maintain the view that its policies in Xinjiang are directed to realize the (constitutional) mandate to provide  employment and the facilitation of employment as the most fundamental project for ensuring and improving people's wellbeing.

Right to self-determination 
While the earliest ROC constitutional documents during the Beiyang era already claim Xinjiang as part of China, Chinese political leaders also acknowledged the principle of self-determination. For example, at a party conference in 1924, Kuomintang leader Sun Yat-sen issued a statement calling for the right of self-determination of all Chinese ethnic groups: "The Kuomintang can state with solemnity that it recognizes the right of self-determination of all national minorities in China and it will organize a free and united Chinese republic."

In 1931, the CCP had issued a constitution for the short-lived Chinese Soviet Republic in Jiangxi which states that Uyghurs and other ethnic minorities, "may either join the Union of Chinese Soviets or secede from it."

In 2022 a number of Taiwanese NGOs came out in support of Uyghur self determination.

Organizations
In general, the wide variety of groups who seek independence can be distinguished as either civil ones excluding violence, or militant ones that do not rule out violence. Other difference are in the type of government they advocate and the role they believe an independent East Turkestan should play in international affairs.

Government-in-exile 
One of the most seminal events of the East Turkestan independence movement was the establishment of the East Turkistan Government-in-Exile by a group of Uyghur, Kazakh, and Uzbek East Turkistani independence activists from across the globe in Washington D.C. on 14 September 2004. The East Turkistan Government in Exile was set up as a parliamentary government in exile and was initially led by Ahmet Igemberdi and Anwar Yusuf Turani The East Turkistan Government in Exile is most active and leading official body advocating for East Turkistan's independence.

Civil organizations
East Turkistan National Awakening Movement - Located in Washington DC, United States. It was formed on 4 June 2017.

Militant organizations
Most militant organizations have been labeled terrorist organizations by the PRC, and some other governments as well. For example, the Turkistan Islamic Party (TIP, also East Turkestan Islamic Movement), which has claimed responsibility for attacks in Xinjiang, has been identified as a terrorist organization by the governments of China, Kazakhstan, Pakistan, Turkey and, until October 2020, the United States, as well as the United Nations.

Historical support
Historically, organizations which have supported the East Turkestan independence movement include:

East Turkestan People's Revolutionary Party (ETPRP) - was a Uyghur communist party and was the largest armed separatist group in Xinjiang in its time. The Soviet Union was involved in funding and support to the ETPRP to start a violent uprising against China in 1968.
United Revolutionary Front of East Turkestan (URFET) - Was a Uyghur nationalist group in Xinjiang that participated in the Xinjiang conflict as an armed separatist force. It was believed to be backed by the Soviet Union (1970-1989) and the U.S. (1990s).
East Turkestan Liberation Organization - Was a secessionist militant Uyghur organization that advocated for an independent Uyghur state in Xinjiang. Widely believed to have links to Taliban and the East Turkestan Islamic Movement.
Committee for National Revolution - Was a Turkic nationalist Uyghur party which existed in 1932–1934. It helped found the First East Turkestan Republic.
Young Kashgar Party - Was a Turkic nationalist Uyghur party which existed from 1933 to 1934. It helped found the First East Turkestan Republic.

Soviet Union

The Soviet Union supported the Uyghur Second East Turkestan Republic in the Ili Rebellion against the Republic of China. According to her autobiography, Dragon Fighter: One Woman's Epic Struggle for Peace with China, Rebiya Kadeer's father served with pro-Soviet Uyghur rebels under the Second East Turkestan Republic in the Ili Rebellion (Three Province Rebellion) in 1944–1946, using Soviet assistance and aid to fight the Republic of China government under Chiang Kai-shek. Kadeer and her family were close friends with White Russian exiles living in Xinjiang and Kadeer recalled that many Uyghurs thought Russian culture was "more advanced" than that of the Uyghurs and they "respected" the Russians a lot.

Many of the Turkic peoples of the Ili region of Xinjiang had close cultural, political, and economic ties with Russia and then the Soviet Union. Many of them were educated in the Soviet Union and a community of Russian settlers lived in the region. As a result, many of the Turkic rebels fled to the Soviet Union and obtained Soviet assistance in creating the Sinkiang Turkic People's Liberation Committee (STPNLC) in 1943 to revolt against Kuomintang rule during the Ili Rebellion. The pro-Soviet Uyghur who later became leader of the revolt and the Second East Turkestan Republic, Ehmetjan Qasim, was Soviet educated and described as "Stalin's man".

The Soviet Union incited separatist activities in Xinjiang through propaganda, encouraging Kazakhs to flee to the Soviet Union and attacking China. China responded by reinforcing the Xinjiang-Soviet border area specifically with Han Bingtuan militia and farmers. The Soviet Union supported Uyghur nationalist propaganda and Uyghur separatist movements against China. The Soviet historians claimed that the Uyghur native land was Xinjiang and Uyghur nationalism was promoted by Soviet versions of history on turcology. The East Turkestan People's Party received support from the Soviet Union. During the 1970s, the Soviets supported the URFET to fight the Chinese.

See also
List of active separatist movements in Asia
First East Turkestan Republic 
Second East Turkestan Republic
Ili Rebellion
East Turkistan Government-in-Exile
Turkic settlement of the Tarim Basin
2008 Uyghur unrest
2013 Xinjiang unrest
Xinjiang conflict
Affirmative action in China
Human rights of ethnic minorities in China
World Uyghur Congress

References

Citations

Sources

Further reading 
 Burhan Shahidi, Xinjiang wushi nian [Fifty Years in Xinjiang], (Beijing, Wenshi ziliao, 1984).
 Clubb, O. E., China and Russia: The 'Great Game'. (NY, Columbia, 1971).
 Forbes, A. D. W. Warlords and Muslims in Chinese Central Asia: A Political History of Republic Sinkiang, 1911–1949 (Cambridge, Cambridge University Press, 1986).
 
 Hasiotis, A. C. Jr. Soviet Political, Economic and Military Involvement in Sinkiang from 1928 to 1949 (NY, Garland, 1987).
 Hierman, Brent (2007). "The Pacification of Xinjiang: Uighur Protest and the Chinese State, 1988–2002". Problems of Post-Communism 54 (3): 48–62.
 Khakimbaev A. A., 'Nekotorye Osobennosti Natsional'no-Osvoboditel'nogo Dvizheniya Narodov Sin'tszyana v 30-kh i 40-kh godakh XX veka' [Some Characters of the National-Liberation Movement of the Xinjiang Peoples in 1930s and 1940s], in Materially Mezhdunarodnoi Konferentsii po Problemam Istorii Kitaya v Noveishchee Vremya, Aprel' 1977, Problemy Kitaya (Moscow, 1978) pp. 113–118.
 Lattimore, O., Pivot of Asia: Sinkiang and the Inner Asian Frontiers of China (Boston, Little, Brown & Co., 1950).
 Rakhimov, T. R. 'Mesto Bostochno-Turkestanskoi Respubliki (VTR) v Natsional'no-Osvoboditel'noi Bor'be Narodov Kitaya' [Role of the Eastern Turkestan Republic (ETR) in the National Liberation Struggle of the Peoples in China], A paper presented at 2-ya Nauchnaya Konferentsiya po Problemam Istorii Kitaya v Noveishchee Vremya, (Moscow, 1977), pp. 68–70.
 Shichor, Yitzhak. (2005). Blow Up: Internal and External Challenges of Uyghur Separatism and Islamic Radicalism to Chinese Rule in Xinjiang. Asian Affairs: An American Review. 32(2), 119–136.
 Taipov, Z. T., V Bor'be za Svobodu [In the Struggle for Freedom], (Moscow, Glavnaya Redaktsiya Vostochnoi Literaturi Izdatel'stvo Nauka, 1974).
 Wang, D., 'The Xinjiang Question of the 1940s: the Story behind the Sino-Soviet Treaty of August 1945', Asian Studies Review, vol. 21, no.1 (1997) pp. 83–105.
 Wang, D., 'The USSR and the Establishment of the Eastern Turkestan Republic in Xinjiang', Journal of Institute of Modern History, Academia Sinica, vol.25 (1996) pp. 337–378.
 Yakovlev, A. G., 'K Voprosy o Natsional'no-Osvoboditel'nom Dvizhenii Norodov Sin'tzyana v 1944–1949', [Question on the National Liberation Movement of the Peoples in Xinjiang in 1944–1945], in Uchenie Zapiski Instituta Voctokovedeniia Kitaiskii Spornik vol.xi, (1955) pp. 155–188.
 Wang, D., Clouds over Tianshan: essays on social disturbance in Xinjiang in the 1940s, Copenhagen, NIAS, 1999
 Wang, D., Under the Soviet shadow: the Yining Incident: ethnic conflicts and international rivalry in Xinjiang, 1944–1949, Hong Kong, The Chinese University Press, 1999.

External links 
 Cartogracy: Uighur Independence Movement
 US Treasury Dept. on Addition of ETIM to Terrorist List
 Unrepresented Nations and Peoples Organization - East Turkestan
 BBC: Islam in China
 East Turkistan National Freedom Center 

 
History of Xinjiang
Independence movements
International disputes
Islam in China
National liberation movements
Political controversies
Rebellions in China
Separatism in China
Turkestan
Xinjiang
Indigenous land rights